International Society for Animal Rights (ISAR) is a 501(c)(3) not-for-profit corporation chartered under the laws of the District of Columbia, United States, that uses education and law to advance animal rights.

History
Harvard University's Office of Government and Community Affairs sponsored an in-depth study of the animal rights movement, examining its tactics, strategies, and long-term goals. Harvard understood that there was a conceptual dichotomy in the movement, noting in its Report that "philosophically, animal rights/welfare groups can be classified as abolitionists or regulationists. The abolitionists, such as ISAR constitute a minority within a movement. They are, however, also the most diligent, tactical and clear thinking. They use the law, publications and education to work for their ultimate goals." 

International Society for Animal Rights, (originally known as National Catholic Society for Animal Welfare, then Society for Animal Rights), was chartered in the District of Columbia over a half-century ago, in 1959, making the organization one of the oldest animal protection organizations in the United States. ISAR is a 501(c)(3) tax exempt non-profit corporation.

International Society for Animal Rights was the first organization in the United States (and probably the world) to express in its corporate name the moral principle guiding the organization: animal rights. The first federal and state court legal cases in the United States to use the word animal rights were in lawsuits brought by International Society for Animal Rights.

ISAR's founder, the late Helen Jones, was an early pioneer in what would later become known as the animal rights movement. She fervently believed that humans have a moral responsibility to animals that can be satisfied only by working toward an end to cruelty to animals. Helen Jones originated dozens of innovative educational programs and campaigns on behalf of animal rights, including the International Homeless Animals' Day.

Early in her career, Helen Jones's strategized to secure rights for animals through public education, legislation, and the American legal system—a strategy that ISAR has employed for decades.

During those years, ISAR has tried to close zoos (Do Not Sanction the Existence of Zoos (Part I), Do Not Sanction the Existence of Zoos (Part II), petitioned against simulated abuse of animals (Campaign to End Simulated Abuse of Animals in Entertainment and Product Sales), opposed the shooting of feral cats (Outdoor Life or Outdoor Death), condemned celebrities who were cruel to animals (Celebrities and Animal Abuse). ISAR and other organizations succeeded in obtaining the issuance of a United States spay/neuter postage stamp and have fought for a similar United Nations stamp (Campaign for a U.N. Spay/Neuter Postage Stamp).

A brief history and accomplishments of International Society for Animal Rights can be found in ISAR's Quarter-Century Battle Against Dog and Cat Overpopulation publication.

In the seminal law review article entitled "The Birth of Animal Rights Law: The Role of Lawyers in the Animal Rights/Protection Movement from 1972-1987" Joyce Tischler, Esq., founder and president of Animal Legal Defense Fund, "explore[s] the roots of a large scale, organized movement, which started in the early 1970s in the United States, spearheaded by attorneys and law students with the express purpose of filing lawsuits to protect animals and establish the concept of their legal rights, regardless of the species of the animals or the ownership interest of humans." In that article, Ms. Tischler names as "the first animal rights lawyer" in the United States ISAR's long-time chairman, Henry Mark Holzer, professor emeritus at Brooklyn Law School.

Ms. Tischler credits Professor Holzer with three accomplishments crucial to establishing the field of what today is known as animal rights law. With the support of ISAR, (1) Bringing the first federal and first state lawsuit to invoke explicitly the moral concept of animal rights; (2) Having founded the Animal Rights Law Reporter, which became "the legal clearinghouse for animal rights law information"; and, (3) Organizing the First National Conference on Animal Rights Law"—an undertaking, in Ms. Tischler's words, "[t]he significance of which cannot be overstated."

Programs 

To advance animal rights, ISAR engages in various activities and emphasizes five major programs.

Dog and Cat Overpopulation: The countless annual deaths of unwanted dogs and cats is a moral obscenity, and ISAR is in the forefront of efforts to stop virtually all breeding.

International Homeless Animals Day: A worldwide ISAR conceived and implemented consciousness-raising memorial to the countless dogs and cats that have fallen victim to overpopulation the previous year, at which countless adoptions are arranged and spay/neuter procedures are performed.

Education: There are many aspects of animal rights, from understanding the philosophical rationales seeking to justify their abuse to humane education of children in their attitude toward animals. For decades, ISAR has created and disseminated animal rights materials.

Animal law: To implement Professor Holzer's vision that the law can be used to foster, protect, and advance animal rights, under his direction ISAR is committed to a variety of law-based programs including legislation, litigation and monographs.

Billboards: Outdoor advertising on ISAR's billboards has consistently proven to be a relatively inexpensive yet powerfully effective means of communicating the spay/neuter message to large numbers of motorists.

References 

Animal rights organizations
Animal charities based in the United States
Legal advocacy organizations in the United States